George Dunn was an American music publisher and lithographer. He entered the music publishing business in 1863, during the American Civil War and rapidly rode to prominence. His firm was George Dunn & Company, and during the War Dunn published thirty-two works on his own and twenty-four with partner Julian A. Selby.

Some of the company's more popular works include "The Southern Soldier Boy", "God, Save the Southern Land", "Ardent Recruit" and "A Gallant Boy".

References

Notes

External links
An amateur singer/musician performing "The Southern Soldier Boy"

American music publishers (people)
Year of birth missing
Year of death missing